Sigman may refer to:

Carl Sigman (1909–2000), American songwriter
Daniel Sigman, American geoscientist, Dusenbury Professor of Geological and Geophysical Sciences at Princeton University
Hugo Sigman (1944), Argentine businessman
Matthew Sigman, American chemist
Morris Sigman (1880–1931), president of the International Ladies' Garment Workers' Union from 1923 to 1928
Stan Sigman, president and chief executive officer of wireless at AT&T
Stephanie Sigman, Mexican actress
Tripp Sigman (1899–1971), Major League Baseball player who played outfielder from 1929 to 1930

Other uses
Sigman, West Virginia

See also
USAHS Blanche F. Sigman, United States Army hospital ship during World War II